Frătăuții may refer to one of two communes in Suceava County, Romania:

Frătăuții Noi
Frătăuții Vechi